Miguel Escueta (born May 6, 1984) is a Filipino male vocalist, singer and performer. He was a regular performer on the 3-year Sunday variety show of GMA 7, Party Pilipinas. In 2013, he launched his own band The Morning Episodes.

Discography

Albums

EP

Singles Featured Artist
This Is Me (Feat. Julianne Tarroja, from the Disney Movie Soundtrack Camp Rock, 2009).

1984 births
21st-century Filipino male singers
Living people
Musicians from Manila
MCA Music Inc. (Philippines) artists
GMA Network personalities